Głuchów may refer to the following places in Poland:

In Łódź Voivodeship (central Poland), a province in central Poland
Głuchów, Kutno County 
Głuchów, Łódź East County 
Głuchów, Skierniewice County 
Głuchów, Wieluń County 
In Masovian Voivodeship (east-central Poland), largest and most populous Polish province, created in 1999
Głuchów, Siedlce County
Głuchów, Grójec County 
In Świętokrzyskie Voivodeship (south-central Poland), one of 16 voivodeships (provinces) into which Poland is divided
Głuchów, Świętokrzyskie Voivodeship, Kazimierza County
In Subcarpathian Voivodeship (south-eastern Poland) 
Głuchów, Gostyń County in Greater Poland Voivodeship (west-central Poland)
Głuchów, Turek County in Greater Poland Voivodeship (west-central Poland)
Głuchów, Wschowa County in Lubusz Voivodeship (west Poland)
Głuchów, Zielona Góra County in Lubusz Voivodeship (west Poland)
Głuchów, Subcarpathian Voivodeship, Łańcut County